Spillers Records, established in 1894, is recognised as the oldest record shop in the world. It is located in Cardiff, Wales. In addition to selling music, it is the city's main location for buying tickets for alternative music concerts.

History
Spillers was founded in 1894 by Henry Spiller at its original location in Queens Arcade, where the shop specialised in the sale of phonographs, wax phonograph cylinders and shellac phonograph discs, also sold and repaired musical instruments In the early 1920s, Spiller's son Edward took over the running of the business and, with the aid of the popular accordionist and bandleader Joe Gregory, sold musical instruments alongside the pre-recorded music. In the late 1940s the shop moved around the corner to a larger premises on The Hayes.

Since 2006 the shop's future was made uncertain when the site rent was increased by Spillers' landlords, Helical Bar, who stated that they are keen for the shop to survive. A local campaign to save the shop was initiated, including a petition initiated by Owen John Thomas (then the Assembly Member for South Wales Central), and supported by members of the Welsh Assembly, the Manic Street Preachers and Columbia Records. In 2010 Spillers moved to the nearby Morgan Arcade, initially on a temporary basis, with the expectation that the move will be made permanent if successful.

In 2019, Spillers called for a boycott of Morrissey and his music due to his support for a far-right political party.

Gallery

Notes

References

External links

Official website
Spillers Myspace
Guardian article on Spillers

Music in Cardiff
Music retailers of the United Kingdom
1894 establishments in Wales
Retail companies established in 1894
Shopping in Cardiff
Buildings and structures in Cardiff
Shops in the United Kingdom
Castle, Cardiff